Mount Ayr, Ayrmont, Ayr Mountains, or variation, may refer to:

Places
 Aïr Mountains, Niger; a triangular massif bordering the Sahara desert
 Ayr Mountains, Kazakhstan

USA
Mount Ayr is the name of several places in the United States:
Mount Ayr, Indiana; a town
Mount Ayr, Iowa; a city
Mount Ayr Township, Kansas

Other uses
 Ayr Mount, Hillsborough, Orange County, North Carolina, USA; a heritage building plantation house

See also
 Ayr Hill, Virginia, USA
 Ayr (disambiguation)